Dance Academy is an Australian teen-oriented television drama.

Dance Academy may also refer to:

Arya Dance Academy, a charitable dance and entertainment organization, dedicated to teaching South Asian dance techniques.
Beijing Dance Academy, an institution of higher education in dance in China.
Detroit Windsor Dance Academy, a nonprofit dance academy in Detroit, Michigan.
Roland Dupree Dance Academy, a  dance centre formerly based in Hollywood, California
Philadelphia Dance Academy, now part of the University of the Arts, Philadelphia.
Dance Academy, Plymouth, a club formerly based at the New Palace Theatre, Plymouth, England
Rotterdam Dance Academy, now part of Codarts University for the Arts, Rotterdam, Netherlands
Shanghai Dance Academy, now the Shanghai Ballet Company.